Pagan Racing was a racing team owned by Texas businessmen Jack and Allan Pagan.

CART Indy 500 entries
The team was founded in 1993 when the team purchased the CART IndyCar equipment of Kenny Bernstein's King Racing. The team fielded a car for Jeff Andretti for the 1993 Indianapolis 500 who finished 29th after a crash. The following year they signed veteran Roberto Guerrero to drive their car. Guerrero started 20th but was knocked out by a crash after only 20 laps. The team upgraded to Ilmor-Mercedes Benz engines in 1995 and Guerrero brought their car home 12th in the "500".

Full-time IRL entrant
In 1996 the open wheel racing world was rocked by "the split" and Pagan elected to stay with the Indy 500 and race in the Indy Racing League. Jack and his son, Allan, used the family's oil industry connections to obtain Pennzoil sponsorship to race in the 1996 Indianapolis 500 with Guerrero. Guerrero was one of the few veterans in the race and was one of the favorites to win on raceday and while he did not win he registered a respectable 5th-place finish. The team also participated in the other two IRL races of the season and Guerrero finished tied for fourth in the short 1996 championship. The team launched a full-season attack on the championship for the 1996–1997 season and the team selected the Infiniti engine to power their cars when the new cars came at the beginning of 1997. However, the Infiniti motors produced significantly less power than the Oldsmobile engines and the team switched engine manufacturers mid-season after poor results and an Indy 500 where Guerrero was unable to maintain a fast pace. By virtue of being one of only a handful of drivers to compete in all the races, Guerrero and the Pagan team finished 7th in the 1996-1997 championship.

Decline
Guerrero returned in 1998.  The team's sponsorship from Pennzoil had left for the new Panther Racing founded by former Pagan crew chief John Barnes. Despite a lack of funding Guerrero ran respectably in the first four races of the season.  That lack of funds brought Stevie Reeves on board for the fifth race of the season. Reeves finished 10th, but prize money did not allow for the team to continue and it ceased operations for the rest of the season. The team returned in 1999 with Jeff Ward and minor sponsorship beginning with the Indy 500. Ward finished in Pagan Racing's best finish of second place. However, Ward had few other good finishes that season and finished 11th in points. Funding uncertainties returned at season's end and the team was again without sponsorship. It fielded an entry for Richie Hearn in the 2000 Indianapolis 500 where Hearn was knocked out by an electrical problem. The race was the team's last as rising costs finally put an end to the small team from Texas.

Drivers
  Roberto Guerrero (1994-1998; CART & IRL)
  Stevie Reeves (1998)
  Jeff Ward (1999)
  Richie Hearn (2000)

Racing results

Complete CART Indy Car World Series results 
(key)

Complete Indy Racing League results
(key)

 The 1999 VisionAire 500K at Charlotte was cancelled after 79 laps due to spectator fatalities.

References

1993 establishments in Texas
2000 disestablishments in Texas
American auto racing teams
Champ Car teams
IndyCar Series teams